Wajid Ali Khan Panni, also known as Wajed Ali Khan Panni II, was a Jatiya Party (Ershad) politician and the former Member of Parliament of Tangail-7.

Early life and family
Wajid Ali Khan Panni was born in Mirzapur, Tangail District, to the Bengali Muslim family known as the Zamindars of Karatia. His father, Khurram Khan Panni, was the Chief Whip of the East Pakistan Provincial Assembly. Panni's brother is Morshed Ali Khan Panni who is also a politician. His great-grandfather, Wajed Ali Khan Panni I, was descended from a Pashtun belonging to the Panni tribe, who had migrated from Afghanistan to Bengal in the 16th century where the family became culturally assimilated.

Panni is a Syndicate member of Independent University, Bangladesh.

Career
Panni was elected to parliament from Tangail-7 as a Jatiya Party candidate in 1986 and 1988.

References

Jatiya Party politicians
Living people
3rd Jatiya Sangsad members
4th Jatiya Sangsad members
Year of birth missing (living people)
Karatia Zamindari family
20th-century Bengalis
21st-century Bengalis